Aedh Ó Cobhthaigh (died 1452) was an Irish poet.

Ó Cobhthaigh was a member of a hereditary bardic family based in what is now County Westmeath. He is recorded as dying of the plague at his house of hospitality in Fertullagh.

See also

 An Clasach Ó Cobhthaigh, died 1415.
 Domhnall Ó Cobhthaigh, died 1446.
 Càrn na Marbh

References

 Ó Cobhthaigh family, pp. 435–436, in Oxford Dictionary of National Biography, volume 41, Norbury-Osbourne, September 2004.

Medieval Irish poets
1452 deaths
People from County Westmeath
15th-century Irish poets
Year of birth unknown
15th-century deaths from plague (disease)
Irish male poets